The Nikon D3100 is a 14.2-megapixel DX format DSLR Nikon F-mount camera announced by Nikon on August 19, 2010. It replaced the D3000 as Nikon's entry level DSLR. It introduced Nikon's new EXPEED 2 image processor and was the first Nikon DSLR featuring full high-definition video recording with full-time autofocus and H.264 compression, instead of Motion JPEG compression. It was also the first Nikon DSLR to provide high-definition video recording at more than one frame rate.

Use is assisted by two Guide Modes: Easy Operation and Advanced Operation tutorial. On April 19, 2012, the D3200 superseded the D3100 as Nikon's entry-level DSLR.

Features
 Nikon's 14.2-megapixel Nikon DX format CMOS sensor with 12 Bit Resolution.
 Nikon EXPEED 2 image processor.
 Active D-Lighting.
 Automatic chromatic aberration correction.
 Sensor cleaning and airflow control system.
 3.0-inch 230,000-dot resolution fixed TFT LCD
 Continuous Drive up to 3 frames per second.
 Live view mode. Live view AF modes: Face priority, Wide area, Normal area, Subject tracking
 Full High Definition video recording (1080p for 10 minutes at 24 frames per second in H.264 codec), additionally 720p30/25/24 and 480p24
 Full-time autofocus in movie mode.
 3D Color Matrix Metering II with Scene Recognition System.
 3D Tracking Multi-CAM 1000 autofocus sensor module with 11 AF points.
 ISO sensitivity 100 to 3200 (6400 and 12800 with boost).
 Nikon F-mount lenses.
 i-TTL flash exposure system without built-in, but support for external wireless flash commander.
 Extended In-camera retouching: D-Lighting, Red-eye reduction, Trimming, Monochrome & filter effects, Color balance, Small picture, Image overlay, NEF (raw) processing, Quick retouch, Straighten, Distortion control, Fisheye, Color outline, Perspective control, Miniature effect, Edit movie
 File formats: JPEG, NEF (Nikon's raw, 12-bit compressed)
 Compatibility with SDXC memory cards

Like Nikon's other consumer-level DSLRs, the D3100 has no in-body autofocus motor, and fully automatic autofocus requires one of the currently 162 lenses with an integrated autofocus-motor. With any other lens, the camera's electronic rangefinder can be used to manually adjust focus.

Can mount unmodified A-lenses (also called Non-AI, Pre-AI or F-type) with support of the electronic rangefinder and without metering.

Optional accessories
The Nikon D3100 has available accessories such as:
 Nikon GP-1 GPS Unit for direct GPS geotagging. Third party solutions partly with 3-axis compass, data-logger, bluetooth and support for indoor use are available from Solmeta, Dawn, Easytag, Foolography, Gisteq and Phottix. See comparisons/reviews.
 Battery grip third party solutions are available.
 Nikon CF-DC1 Soft Case.
 Third party solutions for WLAN transmitter are available.
 Various Nikon Speedlight or third party flash units including devices with Nikon Creative Lighting System wireless flash commander or support for SU-800 Wireless Speedlight Commander.
 Third party radio (wireless) flash control triggers are partly supporting i-TTL, but do not support the Nikon Creative Lighting System (CLS). See reviews.
 Common Optional Lens: AF-S DX NIKKOR 18-55mm f/3.5-5.6G VR, AF-S DX NIKKOR 18-105mm f/3.5-5.6G ED VR, AF NIKKOR 50mm f/1.8D. Note: Lenses without an internal autofocus motor can only use manual focus on the Nikon D3100.
 Other accessories from Nikon and third parties, include protective cases and bags, eyepiece adapters and correction lenses, and underwater housings.

Reception
The D3100 has received many independent reviews and image comparisons at all ISO speeds.

The D3100 is the only known Nikon DSLR with an image sensor interface integrating analog-to-digital converters not made by Nikon: The result is a dynamic range only at the level of competitors like the (higher priced) Canon EOS 600D; lower than other current Nikon DSLRs.

See also
List of Nikon compatible lenses with integrated autofocus-motor

References

External links

 Digitutor Nikon D3100 Nikon (needs Flash)
 Nikon D3100 – Nikon global website

D3100
D3100
Cameras introduced in 2010
Live-preview digital cameras